Alessio Di Basco (born 18 November 1964) was a former Italian professional cyclist. He is best known for winning three stages in the Giro d'Italia and the Vuelta a España.

Major results

1988
Giro d'Italia
1st Stages 9 & 20
3rd Trofeo Laigueglia
1990
6th G.P. Camaiore
1992
1st Stage 1 Tour de Suisse
1994
1st Stage 15 Vuelta a España
1995
Volta a Portugal
1st Stages 1 & 10
1st Stage 5 West Virginia Classic
2nd Coppa Bernocchi
2nd Coppa Sabatini
3rd Giro dell'Emilia
9th Giro di Romagna
1997
6th Coppa Bernocchi

References

External links

Italian male cyclists
Living people
1964 births
Sportspeople from the Province of Pisa
Tour de Suisse stage winners
Cyclists from Tuscany